Akania is a monotypic genus in the family Akaniaceae. The single species, Akania bidwillii (turnipwood), is a tree that is native to subtropical and warm-temperate coastal rainforests in New South Wales and Queensland in Australia. It is known locally as turnipwood because when it is cut down it gives off a foul odour similar to turnips. It blooms with white or pink, fragrant flowers in the spring, and the fruit is a dull-red round capsule that dries down and releases 1-2 seeds. Panicles usually 8–15 cm long; pedicels 5–20 mm long. Calyx 3–4 mm long. Corolla 8–12 mm long.

References

Akaniaceae
Flora of New South Wales
Flora of Queensland
Rosids of Australia
Plants described in 1860
Taxa named by Joseph Dalton Hooker